The Old Turkic script (also known as variously Göktürk script, Orkhon script, Orkhon-Yenisey script, Turkic runes) was the alphabet used by the Göktürks and other early Turkic khanates from the 8th to 10th centuries to record the Old Turkic language.

The script is named after the Orkhon Valley in Mongolia where early 8th-century inscriptions were discovered in an 1889 expedition by Nikolai Yadrintsev. These Orkhon inscriptions were published by Vasily Radlov and deciphered by the Danish philologist Vilhelm Thomsen in 1893.

This writing system was later used within the Uyghur Khaganate. Additionally, a Yenisei variant is known from 9th-century Yenisei Kirghiz inscriptions, and it has likely cousins in the Talas Valley of Turkestan and the Old Hungarian alphabet of the 10th century. Words were usually written from right to left.

Origins 
Many scientists, starting with Vilhelm Thomsen (1893), suggested that Orkhon script is derived from descendants of the Aramaic alphabet in particular via the Pahlavi and Sogdian alphabets of Persia, or possibly via Kharosthi used to write Sanskrit (cf. the Issyk inscription). Vilhelm Thomsen (1893) also mentioned some reports that the Orkhon script could derive from Hunno-Scythian alphabet, but rejected them as being specious. It has been also been speculated that tamgas represent one of the sources of the Old Turkic script, but despite similarities in shape and forms, this hypothesis has been widely rejected as unverifiable, largely because early tamgas are too poorly attested and understood to be subject to a thorough comparison.

Contemporary Chinese sources conflict as to whether the Turks had a written language by the 6th century. The Book of Zhou, dating to the 7th century, mentions that the Turks had a written language similar to that of the Sogdians. Two other sources, the Book of Sui and the History of the Northern Dynasties, claim that the Turks did not have a written language. According to István Vásáry, Old Turkic script was invented under the rule of the first khagans and was modelled after the Sogdian fashion. Several variants of the script came into being as early as the first half of the 6th century.<ref>Sigfried J. de Laet, Joachim Herrmann, (1996), History of Humanity: From the seventh century B.C. to the seventh century A.D., p. 478</ref>

Corpus
The Old Turkic corpus consists of about two hundred inscriptions, plus a number of manuscripts.
The inscriptions, dating from the 7th to 10th century, were discovered in present-day Mongolia (the area of the Second Turkic Khaganate and the Uyghur Khaganate that succeeded it), in the upper Yenisey basin of central-south Siberia, and in smaller numbers, in the Altay mountains and Xinjiang. The texts are mostly epitaphs (official or private), but there are also graffiti and a handful of short inscriptions found on archaeological artifacts, including a number of bronze mirrors.

The website of the Language Committee of Ministry of Culture and Information of the Republic of Kazakhstan lists 54 inscriptions from the Orkhon area, 106 from the Yenisei area, 15 from the Talas area, and 78 from the Altai area. The most famous of the inscriptions are the two monuments (obelisks) which were erected in the Orkhon Valley between 732 and 735 in honor of the Göktürk prince Kül Tigin and his brother the emperor Bilge Kağan. The Tonyukuk inscription, a monument situated somewhat farther east, is slightly earlier, dating to ca. 722. These inscriptions relate in epic language the legendary origins of the Turks, the golden age of their history, their subjugation by the Chinese (Tang-Gokturk wars), and their liberation by Bilge.

The Old Turkic manuscripts, of which there are none earlier than the 9th century, were found in present-day Xinjiang and represent Old Uyghur, a different Turkic dialect from the one represented in the Old Turkic inscriptions in the Orkhon valley and elsewhere. They include Irk Bitig, a 9th-century manuscript book on divination.

 Table of characters 

Old Turkic being a synharmonic language, a number of consonant signs are divided into two "synharmonic sets", one for front vowels and the other for back vowels. Such vowels can be taken as intrinsic to the consonant sign, giving the Old Turkic alphabet an aspect of an abugida script. In these cases, it is customary to use superscript numerals ¹ and ² to mark consonant signs used with back and front vowels, respectively. This convention was introduced by Thomsen (1893), and followed by Gabain (1941), Malov (1951) and Tekin (1968).

 Vowels 

 Consonants 

Synharmonic sets

Other consonantal signs

A colon-like symbol (⁚) is sometimes used as a word separator. In some cases a ring (⸰) is used instead.

A reading example (right to left): 𐱅𐰭𐰼𐰃 transliterated t²ñr²i, this spells the name of the Turkic sky god, Täñri.

 Variants 

Variants of the script were found from Mongolia and Xinjiang in the east to the Balkans in the west. The preserved inscriptions were dated to between the 8th and 10th centuries.

These alphabets are divided into four groups by Kyzlasov (1994) 
 Asiatic group (includes Orkhon proper)
 Eurasiatic group
 Southern Europe group

The Asiatic group is further divided into three related alphabets:
 Orkhon alphabet, Göktürks, 8th to 10th centuries
 Yenisei alphabet,
 Talas alphabet, a derivative of the Yenisei alphabet, Kangly or Karluks 8th to 10th centuries. Talas inscriptions include Terek-Say rock inscriptions found in the 1897, Koysary text, Bakaiyr gorge inscriptions, Kalbak-Tash 6 and 12 inscriptions, Talas alphabet has 29 identified letters.

The Eurasiatic group is further divided into five related alphabets:
 Achiktash, used in Sogdia 8th to 10th centuries.
 South-Yenisei, used by the Göktürks 8th to 10th centuries.
 Two especially similar alphabets: the Don alphabet, used by the Khazars, 8th to 10th centuries; and the Kuban alphabet, used by the Bulgars, 8th to 13th centuries. Inscriptions in both alphabets are found in the Pontic–Caspian steppe and on the banks of the Kama river.
 Tisza, used by the Pechenegs 8th to 10th centuries.

A number of alphabets are incompletely collected due to the limitations of the extant inscriptions. Evidence in the study of the Turkic scripts includes Turkic-Chinese bilingual inscriptions, contemporaneous Turkic inscriptions in the Greek alphabet, literal translations into Slavic languages, and paper fragments with Turkic cursive writing from religion, Manichaeism, Buddhist, and legal subjects of the 8th to 10th centuries found in Xinjiang.

 Unicode 

The Unicode block for Old Turkic is U+10C00–U+10C4F. It was added to the Unicode standard in October 2009, with the release of version 5.2. It includes separate "Orkhon" and "Yenisei" variants of individual characters.

Since Windows 8 Unicode Old Turkic writing support was added in the Segoe font.

See also

Khazar language
Tariat inscriptions
Sükhbaatar inscriptions

 References 
 Citations 

 Sources 

 Diringer, David. The Alphabet: a Key to the History of Mankind, New York, NY: Philosophical Library, 1948, pp. 313–315.
 Erdal, Marcel. 2004. A grammar of Old Turkic. Leiden & Boston: Brill.
 Guzev, V.G., Kljashtornyj, S.G. The Turkic Runic script: Is the hypothesis of its indigenous origin no more viable? Rocznik Orientalistyczny, T. 49, Z. 2 (1994), wyd. 1995 [19] 
  LFaulmann, Carl. 1990 (1880). Das Buch der Schrift. Frankfurt am Main: Eichborn.  
 Février, James G. Histoire de l'écriture, Paris: Payot, 1948, pp. 311–317 
 Ishjatms, N. "Nomads in Eastern Central Asia", in the "History of civilizations of Central Asia", Volume 2, UNESCO Publishing, 1996, 
 
 Kyzlasov, I.L. "Runic Scripts of Eurasian Steppes", Moscow, Eastern Literature, 1994, 
Malov, S.E. 1951, Pamjatniki Drevnitjurkskoj Pisʹmennosti (Памятники Древнитюркской Письменности), Moskva & Leningrad. 
 Muxamadiev, Azgar. (1995). Turanian Writing (Туранская Письменность). In Zakiev, M. Z.(Ed.), Problemy lingvoėtnoistorii tatarskogo naroda (Проблемы лингвоэтноистории татарского народа). Kazan: Akademija Nauk Tatarstana. 
Róna-Tas, A. 1991. An introduction to Turkology. Szeged.
 Tekin, Talat. A Grammar of Orkhon Turkic. Indiana University Uralic and Altaic Series, vol. 69 (Bloomington/The Hague: Mouton, 1968)
 Thomsen, Vilhelm. Inscriptions de l'Orkhon déchiffrées, Suomalais-ugrilainen seura, Helsinki Toimituksia, no. 5 Helsingfors: La société de littérature Finnoise  
 Vasilʹiev, D.D. Korpus tjurkskix runičeskix pamjatnikov Bassina Eniseja [Corpus of the Turkic Runic Monuments of the Yenisei Basin], Leningrad: USSR Academy of Science, 1983 
 von Gabain, A. 1941. Alttürkische Grammatik mit Bibliographie, Lesestücken und Wörterverzeichnis, auch Neutürkisch. Mit vier Schrifttafeln und sieben Schriftproben. (Porta Linguarum Orientalium; 23) Leipzig: Otto Harrassowitz.

External links

Türk bitig - Old Turkic inscriptions, Texts, Translations
Orkhon Alphabet page from Omniglot
Gokturkish Keyboard by Isa SARI
Old Turkic Virtual Keyboard by Pamukkale University
glyph table (kyrgyz.ru)

Хөх Түрүгийн Бичиг (in Mongolian)
Göktürükçe çevirici (An online converter for Turkish alphabet )

Runiform scripts
Alphabets
Göktürks
History of literature in China
Obsolete writing systems
Turkic alphabets
Alphabets used by Turkic languages
Right-to-left writing systems